Small Town Girl is a 1953 musical film directed by László Kardos and starring Jane Powell, Farley Granger, and Ann Miller. Busby Berkeley choreographed several dance numbers. Bobby Van performed the memorable "Street Dance", in which he hopped all around town.  The film features song performances by Nat King Cole. The film was nominated for the Academy Award for Best Original Song, "My Flaming Heart", with music by Nicholas Brodszky and lyrics by Leo Robin. It has no relation to the 1936 MGM film of the same title.Plot
Rick Belrow Livingston (Farley Granger), on his way to elope with self-obsessed Broadway star Lisa (Ann Miller), is sentenced to 30 days in jail for speeding through a small town. Quite by accident, he meets the daughter of the judge, Cindy Kimbell (Jane Powell). He persuades her to let him out for one night, so that he can visit Lisa on the premise he is seeing his "poor sick mother" (Billie Burke) on her birthday. After spending a night out on the town with him, Cindy starts to fall for Livingston, but Papa Schlemmer (S. Z. Sakall) wants her to marry his son (Bobby Van) whose real ambition is a career on Broadway.

Cast

Production notes
Country music star Hank Williams was reportedly offered the bit role of the sheriff by MGM producer Joe Pasternak, which he turned down. The part eventually was played by Jonathan Cott. Shortly after, Williams actually met with MGM's president, Dore Schary, to discuss other offers besides Small Town Girl, but Williams was "disrespectful" upon meeting - including refusing to take his hat off - and that was the end of Williams' chances for motion picture appearances. Both of these events are dramatized as one incident in the 2015 film I Saw the Light. Williams died in January 1953, three months before Small Town Girl was released.

Reception
According to MGM records, the film made $1,365,000 in the U.S. and Canada and $762,000 elsewhere, resulting in a loss of $287,000.

Legacy
In recent years, “Take Me to Broadway” (also known as the "Jumping Song") as performed by Bobby Van has been referenced in commercials and music videos, including one for Goldfrapp's song "Happiness", in which a happy man jumps through the streets, shaking hands with people and playing with garbage can lids. Peter Wolf also recreated the scene in the music video for his 1987 song "Come As You Are". In the 2014 Tony Awards,  Hugh Jackman hopped in his intro and viewed Bobby Van's dance on a TV, backstage. The number was featured in Jack Haley Jr.'s 1985 film That's Dancing!'', a celebration of dance in American film.

References

External links 
 
 
 
 

1953 films
1950s romantic musical films
American romantic musical films
Films set in New York City
Metro-Goldwyn-Mayer films
Films produced by Joe Pasternak
1950s English-language films
1950s American films